The rufous-throated dipper or Argentine dipper (Cinclus schulzii) is an aquatic songbird found in South America, and is part of the dipper family.

It lives along rapid rocky streams of the Southern Andean Yungas, in far southern Bolivia and northwestern Argentina at 800 metres to 2500 metres in elevation. The bird breeds in the alder zone at 1500 metres to 2500 metres in elevation.

BirdLife International have classified this species as "Vulnerable". Threats included reservoir construction, hydroelectric dams, and irrigation schemes. The current population is estimated at 3,000 to 4,000.

Taxonomy
The rufous-throated dipper was described by the German ornithologist Jean Cabanis in 1882 and given the binomial name Cinclus schulzii. The type locality is the mountain of Cerro Bayo in northern Argentina. The specific epithet schulzii was chosen to honour the German zoologist Friedrich W. Schulz (1866-1933) who had collected the specimen. The species is monotypic. Of the five species now placed in the genus, a molecular genetic study has shown that the rufous-throated dipper is most closely related to the other South American species, the white-capped dipper (Cinclus leucocephalus).

References

BirdLife Species Factsheet
 World Bird Data Project

External links
ARKive - images and movies of the rufous-throated dipper (Cinclus schulzi)

rufous-throated dipper
Birds of the Southern Andean Yungas
rufous-throated dipper
rufous-throated dipper